65th New York Film Critics Circle Awards
January 9, 2000

Best Picture:
 Topsy-Turvy 
The 65th New York Film Critics Circle Awards, honoring the best in film for 1999, were announced on 16 December 1999 and presented on 9 January 2000 by the New York Film Critics Circle.

Winners
Best Actor:
Richard Farnsworth – The Straight Story
Runners-up: Russell Crowe – The Insider and Jim Broadbent – Topsy-Turvy
Best Actress:
Hilary Swank – Boys Don't Cry
Runners-up: Julianne Moore – The End of the Affair and Janet McTeer – Tumbleweeds
Best Animated Film:
South Park: Bigger, Longer & Uncut
Runners-up: The Iron Giant and Toy Story 2
Best Cinematography:
Freddie Francis – The Straight Story
Runner-up: Emmanuel Lubezki – Sleepy Hollow
Best Director:
Mike Leigh – Topsy-Turvy 
Runners-up: David Lynch – The Straight Story and Sam Mendes – American Beauty
Best Film:
Topsy-Turvy
Runners-up: American Beauty, Being John Malkovich and The Straight Story
Best First Film:
Spike Jonze – Being John Malkovich 
Runners-up: Kimberly Peirce – Boys Don't Cry and Sam Mendes – American Beauty
Best Foreign Language Film:
All About My Mother (Todo sobre mi madre) • Spain/France
Best Non-Fiction Film:
Buena Vista Social Club 
Runner-up: Mr. Death: The Rise and Fall of Fred A. Leuchter, Jr.
Best Screenplay:
Alexander Payne and Jim Taylor – Election
Best Supporting Actor:
John Malkovich – Being John Malkovich
Runners-up: Jamie Foxx – Any Given Sunday and Christopher Plummer – The Insider
Best Supporting Actress:
Catherine Keener – Being John Malkovich
Runner-up: Chloë Sevigny – Boys Don't Cry
Special Award:
Manny Farber

References

External links
1999 Awards

1999
New York Film Critics Circle Awards
1999 in American cinema
New York
1999 in New York City